is an original Japanese anime television series produced by Kadokawa Corporation, animated by Passione, and directed by Nobuyoshi Nagayama. The series aired from October to December 2022 on AT-X and other networks. A manga adaptation by Ryūdai Ishizaka began serialization in Hakusensha's Young Animal magazine in June 2022.

Plot
One day before he heads to school, Asahi Kashiwagi watches a fortune telling program on television. Every prediction turns out to be true when he encounters five girls along the way, with each one eventually giving him a love confession. Asahi now has to find a way to deal with this unexpected situation.

Characters

Main characters

The protagonist of the series. He receives five love confessions on his first day of school after seeing a fortune telling program on television, which annoys him. It is later revealed that he was recruited for a virtual reality program to experience a computer generated world with simulated characters. 

A Japanese student and one of Asahi's classmates. She wears glasses and has a bright and cheerful personality. She is also a talented cook for her housemates. It is later revealed that she is actually a simulated character and that she was the first among the artificial intelligence girls to be created. Because of this, she is said to be the most similar to the AI girls' base, Asahi's childhood friend Ai Izawa.

An American student and one of Asahi's classmates. She is always seen wearing headphones with cat ears. She wants to be good at Japanese by studying kanji. It is later revealed that she is actually a simulated character. Later on in the series, she becomes a magical girl like Karin and Irina.

A shy Bulgarian student and one of Asahi's classmates. She is actually a cross-dressing girl who has been forced to live like a boy under the name  by her late father. It is later revealed that she is actually a simulated character. She later also becomes a magical girl.

The class' teacher who comes from China. Because she is still young, her relationship with her students is more like that of an older sister. She also has a clumsy personality, particularly at home. She is a former tai chi assassin of an underground organization and has the codename "Bloody Tiger". It is later revealed that she is actually a simulated character.

A self-conscious German student and one of Asahi's classmates. She is also active as a model and as a magical girl. It is later revealed that she is actually a simulated character.

Supporting characters

Asahi's classmate and self-proclaimed best friend. He comes from a rich family. It is later revealed that he is actually a simulated character and an alter-ego of scientist Yoshino Feynman.

A rabbit-shaped alarm clock which says things to Asahi and the others. Loverin has a screen that can display both time and other information.

Asahi's childhood friend from his past life. She died from a brain tumor two years prior to the start of the story, but her consciousness formed the basis of a new AI model. Additionally, her memories were implanted into the five simulated characters created by the international VR companies.

A strange scientist who works on AI in a technological company called Cavenish. She informs Asahi that the girls he was living with were all part of a VR simulation. She is also investigating what led the simulation to prematurely end.

Media

Manga
A manga adaptation illustrated by Ryūdai Ishizaka began serialization in Hakusensha's Young Animal magazine on June 24, 2022. The first tankōbon volume was released on September 29, 2022.

Volume list

Anime
The original anime television series produced by Kadokawa Corporation and animated by Passione was announced on March 25, 2022. The series was directed by Nobuyoshi Nagayama, with assistant direction by Midori Yui and Fujiaki Asari, scripts written by Ryō Yasumoto, character designs handled by Kazuyuki Ueda, who also serves as chief animation director, and music composed by Kenichiro Suehiro. It aired from October 12 to December 28, 2022, on AT-X and other networks. Konomi Suzuki performed the opening theme song "Love? Reason why!!", while Miku Itō, Ayana Taketatsu, Rie Takahashi, Hisako Kanemoto and Marika Kouno performed the first ending theme song "Flop Around". Itō performed the second ending theme song "Lost in the white" and the insert song for episode 12, "With You". Sentai Filmworks licensed the series, and is streaming it on HIDIVE.

Episode list

See also
 Iwa-Kakeru! Climbing Girls, a manga series also illustrated by Ryūdai Ishizaka

Notes

References

External links
Official website 
Official manga website at Young Animal 

2022 anime television series debuts
Anime with original screenplays
AT-X (TV network) original programming
Hakusensha manga
Harem anime and manga
Passione (company)
Romantic comedy anime and manga
School life in anime and manga
Science fiction anime and manga
Seinen manga
Sentai Filmworks
Television series about artificial intelligence
Television shows about virtual reality